"I Hear a Rhapsody" is a 1941 pop song that became a jazz standard, composed by George Fragos, Jack Baker, and Dick Gasparre. Written in 1940, in 1941 it was a top 10 hit for three separate artists, Charlie Barnet, Jimmy Dorsey and Dinah Shore.
“I Hear a Rhapsody” was at the top of "Your Hit Parade" in 1941. It was featured in the 1952 film noir Clash by Night, in which it was sung by Tony Martin. The soundtrack featured jazz notables such as pianist Gerald Wiggins, alto saxophonist Benny Carter, and tenor saxophonist Coleman Hawkins. The film, directed by Fritz Lang, involved a love triangle in a small fishing village and starred Barbara Stanwyck, Robert Ryan, and Paul Douglas.

Versions
 Charlie Barnet and His Orchestra with Bob Carroll, recorded October 14, 1940 (10" shellac single, Bluebird, 1941)
 Jimmy Dorsey and His Orchestra with Bob Eberly, recorded December 9, 1940 (10" shellac single, Decca, 1941)
 Duke Ellington and His Orchestra with Herb Jeffries and Ben Webster, recorded January 15, 1941, in Hollywood (first released in the 1970s)
 Tommy Dorsey with Frank Sinatra, NBC radio performance from January 30, 1941 (first released in 1994 on The Song Is You)
 Erroll Garner on Overture to Dawn (Vol. 1), recorded in 1944 (10", Blue Note, 1952)
 Frank Sinatra, single with "I Could Write a Book" in 1952 (10" release with I've Got a Crush on You, 1954)
 George Shearing on When Lights Are Low, 1955; with Jim Hall on First Edition, 1982; I Hear a Rhapsody - Live at the Blue Note, 1992
 Zoot Sims with Bob Brookmeyer on Tonite's Music Today, 1956
 Patti Page on Music for Two in Love, 1956
 Jackie McLean on Makin' the Changes, 1960
 Billy Eckstine on Once More with Feeling, 1960
 John Coltrane on Lush Life, 1961
 Art Blakey on Art Blakey!!!!! Jazz Messengers!!!!!, 1961
 Bill Evans & Jim Hall on Undercurrent, 1962
 Don Friedman on Circle Waltz, 1962
 Ahmad Jamal on Rhapsody_(Ahmad_Jamal_album) (Cadet, 1965)
 Bill Evans Trio on Montreux II (CTI, 1970)
 Lee Konitz, Michel Petrucciani on Toot Sweet, 1982
 Chick Corea with Miroslav Vitous, Roy Haynes on Trio Music - Live in Europe (ECM, 1986)
 Keith Jarrett with Gary Peacock and Jack De Johnette on Standards in Norway, recorded live in 1989 (ECM, 1995)
 Bennie Wallace on The Old Songs (AudioQuest, 1993)

References

1941 songs
1941 singles